Ellen Tomek (born May 1, 1984, in Flint, Michigan) is an American rower. Along with Megan Kalmoe she finished 5th in the women's double sculls at the 2008 Summer Olympics.

She has qualified to represent the United States at the 2020 Summer Olympics. She is openly lesbian.

References

1984 births
Living people
American female rowers
Olympic rowers of the United States
Rowers at the 2008 Summer Olympics
Rowers at the 2016 Summer Olympics
Rowers at the 2020 Summer Olympics
Sportspeople from Flint, Michigan
World Rowing Championships medalists for the United States
American LGBT sportspeople
21st-century American women